Saracen was a term used in the early centuries, both in Greek and Latin writings, to refer to the people who lived in and near what was designated by the Romans as Arabia Petraea and Arabia Deserta. The term's meaning evolved during its history of usage. During the Early Middle Ages, the term came to be associated with the tribes of Arabia. 

The oldest known source mentioning "Saracens" in relation to Islam dates back to the 7th century, in the Greek-language Christian tract Doctrina Jacobi. Among other major events, the tract discusses the Muslim conquest of the Levant, which occurred after the rise of the Rashidun Caliphate following the death of the Islamic prophet Muhammad. The Roman Catholic Church and European Christian leaders used the term during the Middle Ages to refer to Muslims—usually Arabs, Turks, and Iranians. 

By the 12th century, "Saracen" had become synonymous with "Muslim" in Medieval Latin literature. Such an expansion in the meaning of the term had begun centuries earlier among the Byzantine Greeks, as evidenced in documents from the 8th century. Before the 16th century, "Saracen" was commonly used in Western languages to refer to Arab Muslims, and the terms "Muslim" and "Islam" were generally not used, with a few isolated exceptions. The term gradually became obsolete following the Age of Discovery.

Early usage and origins
The Latin term Saraceni is of unknown original meaning. There are claims of it being derived from the Semitic triliteral root šrq "east" and šrkt "tribe, confederation". Another possible Semitic root is srq "to steal, rob, thief", more specifically from the noun sāriq, pl. sāriqīn, which means "thief, marauder". In his Levantine Diary, covering the years 1699–1740, the Damascene writer Hamad bin Kanan al-Salhi used the term sarkan to mean "travel on a military mission" from the Near East to parts of Southern Europe which were under Ottoman Empire rule, particularly Cyprus and Rhodes.

Ptolemy's 2nd-century work, Geography, describes Sarakēnḗ as a region in the northern Sinai Peninsula. Ptolemy also mentions a people called the Sarakēnoí living in the northwestern Arabian Peninsula (near neighbor to the Sinai). Eusebius in his Ecclesiastical history narrates an account wherein Pope Dionysius of Alexandria mentions Saracens in a letter while describing the  persecution of Christians by the Roman emperor Decius: "Many were, in the Arabian mountain, enslaved by the barbarous 'sarkenoi'." The Augustan History also refers to an attack by Saraceni on Pescennius Niger's army in Egypt in 193, but provides little information as to identifying them.

Both Hippolytus of Rome and Uranius mention three distinct peoples in Arabia during the first half of the third century: the Taeni, the Saraceni, and the Arabes. The Taeni, later identified with the Arab people called Tayy, were located around Khaybar (an oasis north of Medina) and also in an area stretching up to the Euphrates. The Saraceni were placed north of them. These Saracens, located in the northern Hejaz, were described as people with a certain military ability who were opponents of the Roman Empire and who were classified by the Romans as barbarians.

The Saracens are described as forming the equites from Phoenicia and Thamud. In one document, the defeated enemies of Diocletian's campaign in the Syrian Desert are described as Saracens. Other 4th-century military reports make no mention of Arabs, but refer to Saracen groups ranging as far east as Mesopotamia who were involved in battles on both the Sasanian and Roman sides. The Saracens were named in the Roman administrative document Notitia Dignitatum, dating from the time of Theodosius I in the 4th century, as comprising distinctive units in the Roman army. They were distinguished in the document from Arabs.

Medieval usage of the term saracene 

No later than the early fifth century, Jewish and Christian writers began to equate Saracens with Arabs. Saracens were associated with Ishmaelites (descendants of Abraham's older son Ishmael) in some strands of Jewish, Christian, and Islamic genealogical thinking. The writings of Jerome (d. 420) are the earliest known version of the claim that Ishmaelites chose to be called Saracens in order to identify with Abraham's "free" wife Sarah, rather than as Hagarenes, which would have highlighted their association with Abraham's "slave woman" Hagar. This claim was popular during the Middle Ages, but derives more from Paul's allegory in the New Testament letter to the Galatians than from historical data. The name Saracen was not indigenous among the populations so described but was applied to them by Greco-Roman historians based on Greek place names.

As the Middle Ages progressed, usage of the term in the Latin West changed, but its connotation remained associated with opponents of Christianity, and its exact definition is unclear. In an 8th-century polemical work, John of Damascus criticized the Saracens as followers of a false prophet and "forerunner[s] to the Antichrist," and further connected their name to Ishmael and his expulsion.

By the 12th century, Medieval Europeans used the term Saracen as both an ethnic and religious marker. In some Medieval literature, Saracens were equated with Muslims in general and described as dark-skinned, while Christians lighter-skinned. An example is in The King of Tars, a medieval romance. The Song of Roland, an Old French 11th-century heroic poem, refers to the black skin of Saracens as their only exotic feature.

The term Saracen remained in use in the West as a synonym for "Muslim" until the 18th century. When the Age of Discovery commenced, it gradually lost popularity to the newer term Mohammedan, which came into usage from at least the 16th century. After this point, Saracen enjoyed only sporadic usage (for example, in the phrase "Indo-Saracenic architecture") before being outmoded entirely.

In the Wiltshire dialect, the meaning of "Sarsen" (Saracen) was eventually extended to refer to anything regarded as non-Christian, whether Muslim or pagan. From that derived the still current term "Sarsen" (a shortening of "Saracen stone"), denoting the kind of stone used by the builders of Stonehenge, long predating Islam.

Use in medieval entertainment: Crusade cycle

The rhyming stories of the Old French Crusade cycle were popular with medieval audiences in Northern France, Occitania and Iberia. Beginning in the late 12th century, stories about the sieges of Antioch and Jerusalem gave accounts of battle scenes and suffering, and of Saracen plunder, their silks and gold, and masterfully embroidered and woven tents. From the story of the Frankish knights at the tent of Saracen leader Corbaran:

The tent was very rich, draped with brilliant silk,
and patterned green silk was thrown over the grass,
with lengths of cut fabric worked with birds and beasts.
The cords with which it was tied are of silk,
and the quilt was sewn with a shining, delicate samit.

History and culture

See also

 Hagarenes
 Ishmaelites
 Magarites
 Muhajirun
 Arab–Byzantine wars
 Early Muslim conquests
 Serkland
 Böszörmény
 Moors

Notes

Bibliography

 
 </ref>
 
 
 
 
 
 Timani, Hussam, Saracens, in Muhammad in History, Thought, and Culture: An Encyclopedia of the Prophet of God (2 vols.), Edited by C. Fitzpatrick and A. Walker, Santa Barbara, ABC-CLIO, 2014, Vol. II, pp. 538–542. 
Tolan, John; Veinstein, Gilles and Henry Laurens. 2013. Europe and the Islamic World: A History. Princeton University Press. .
Tolan, John Victor. 2002. Saracens: Islam in the Medieval European Imagination. Columbia University Press. 

Ancient peoples
Arabs
Christianity and Islam
Ethnonyms
Exonyms
Ethno-cultural designations